Solidarity, formerly known as the Anti-Austerity Alliance (AAA), is a socialist political party in Ireland, launched in 2014. It had been registered as a political party to contest local elections, and ran at least forty candidates in the 2014 Irish local elections. All Solidarity's elected representatives are members of the Socialist Party.

History

Anti-Austerity Alliance 

The party contested the 2014 local elections on a platform of job creation. On 8 April 2014, it launched a plan to create 150,000 jobs across Ireland by replacing the controversial JobBridge and Gateway initiatives with a "real jobs programme of public works, free education and genuine training schemes".

Paul Murphy was elected to Dáil Éireann for Dublin South-West under the Anti-Austerity Alliance banner at a by-election in October 2014. In September 2019 he resigned from the party.

Ruth Coppinger was elected for Dublin West as a TD at the 2014 Dublin West by-election. Both were re-elected at the 2016 Irish general election. Coppinger became the first woman to be nominated for the role of Taoiseach.

Mick Barry was elected as TD for the Cork North–Central constituency in 2016. According to the Irish Examiner, Barry has been "a leading figure in the Cork and national campaigns" against household and water charges.

On 7 August 2015, the party was removed from the Register of Political Parties. It held discussions in August 2015 with the People Before Profit about forming a new political grouping. On 17 September 2015, the two parties announced that they had formally registered as a single political party for electoral purposes. The new organisation was called "Anti-Austerity Alliance–People Before Profit" and subsequently renamed as Solidarity–People Before Profit. In 2021, it was renamed again as People Before Profit–Solidarity.

Relaunch as Solidarity
On 10 March 2017, the Anti-Austerity Alliance called a press conference and announced that it would now be relaunched as Solidarity. This name change was made to reflect the "many movements emerging on workplace, economic and social issues" and that while "the AAA has played a key role in campaigns like the water charges and housing", that the organisation under the name of Solidarity "will continue to do so, but the name will now better reflect our campaigning work on Repeal, LGBTQ issues and equality generally."

Cork City Councillor Lil O'Donnell left the party at the time of the rebranding as Solidarity.

Rita Harrold unsuccessfully stood in Dublin at the 2019 European Parliament election.

At the 2020 general election, Coppinger lost her seat, leaving Barry as the party's only TD. The party suffered a significant drop in its vote share.

Ideology and policies
The party intends to end "Ireland's status as a tax haven", introduce a financial transactions tax, abolish property tax, increase corporation tax, increase income tax on high earners, and introduce a ‘Millionaire's Tax’ on net personal wealth in excess of €1 million.

Solidarity opposes a referendum on Irish reunification as a "border poll" on the grounds they believe it would further entrench sectarianism, and has stated it would campaign for a boycott of any such referendum if it were held. Solidarity believes that Ireland, England, Scotland, and Wales should merge and form a socialist federation, which should aspire to be part of a Socialist Federation of Europe. The Phoenix has opined that this position is a "bizarre fusion of Trotskyism and British Unionism" that "articulates a unionist outlook dressed in socialist rhetoric".

Criticism
All Solidarity's elected representatives are members of the Socialist Party, which has led to criticism that Solidarity is a front organisation for the Trotskyist Socialist Party.

Election results

General elections

Local elections

European elections

See also

 United Left Alliance

References

External links

 Official website

2014 establishments in Ireland
Anti-austerity protests in the European Union
Ecosocialist parties
Left-wing politics in Ireland
Political parties established in 2014
Political parties in the Republic of Ireland
Post-2008 Irish economic downturn
Socialist Party (Ireland)
Socialist parties in Ireland